Cocquerel is a commune in the Somme department in Hauts-de-France in northern France.

Geography

Towns Nearby
The following diagram shows the towns nearby with in a  radius.

Population

Personalities
Gilles de Robien, politician, Mayor of Amiens and a former national Minister of education.

See also
Communes of the Somme department

References

Communes of Somme (department)